Aaron Chapman  (1771 – 28 December 1850) was an English writer and politician. He was the inaugural member of Parliament for Whitby, representing the Conservative Party.

Chapman was elected the member of Parliament for Whitby for four successive parliaments. He later served as a magistrate in Middlesex and as an Elder Brother of Trinity House, the maritime charity. He also served as a trustee of Ramsgate Harbour, and as a director of the Hudson's Bay Company.

In 1825 he was a director of the New Zealand Company, a venture chaired by the wealthy John George Lambton, Whig MP (and later 1st Earl of Durham), that made the first attempt to colonise New Zealand.

He married Elizabeth (née Barker) on 2 June 1796. The couple had four sons and two daughters. Their third son, Edward, served as a director of the Bank of England.

Chapman died at his home in Highbury Park, London, and was interred in Hornsey, Middlesex (now north London).

References

1771 births
1850 deaths
19th-century English politicians
Conservative Party (UK) MPs for English constituencies
People from Hornsey
People from Whitby
UK MPs 1832–1835
UK MPs 1837–1841
UK MPs 1841–1847
Members of Trinity House
English justices of the peace